Virgin of Azahar is one of the invocations of Mary, having her origin in the Spanish city of Beniaján, near Murcia. Beniaján is known worldwide by the abundant production of citrus fruits that its factories export around the world. Citrus is the most important industrial activity in this town.

The sculpture receives cult in a small hermitage erected in city's outskirts, in a fecund place called Rincón de Villanueva. Her name comes from the natural citrus blossom branch (Azahar in Spanish) which is on the Virgin's hands. Orange citrus and lemon trees are around this small church.

Festivity 
The festivity date is 1 May. The sculpture is carried from Beniaján to the hermitage, crossing gardens and fields, in a folk procession.

Titles of Mary